Heinrich Sutermeister (12 August 1910 – 16 March 1995) was a Swiss composer, most famous for his opera Romeo und Julia.

Life and career

Sutermeister was born in Feuerthalen. During the early 1930s he was a student at the Akademie der Tonkunst in Munich, where Carl Orff was his teacher. Orff thereafter remained a powerful influence on his music. Returning to Switzerland in the mid-1930s, Sutermeister devoted his life to composition. He wrote some works for the radio, starting with Die schwarze Spinne in 1936, before turning later to television opera. His most successful stage work was Romeo und Julia, premiered in Dresden in 1940 under Karl Böhm.

Sutermeister's penultimate stage work, Madame Bovary, first given in Zurich in 1967, is loosely based on Flaubert's novel. With many characters cut, it consists largely of monologues for Emma Bovary, who was sung by Anneliese Rothenberger.

For his final opera, he adapted Eugène Ionesco's play Exit the King (Le Roi se meurt). According to musicologist Elizabeth Forbes, this opera, premiered in 1985 at Bavarian State Opera, with only six characters, a tiny chorus and a small orchestra is, in its modest way, as effective as anything Sutermeister wrote.

He was the brother of Hans Martin Sutermeister. Their grandfather was the folklorist Otto Sutermeister.

He died in Vaux-sur-Morges.

Works

Stage and broadcast works

Concert, chamber and religious music 
1. Piano Concerto, 1943
Capriccio for unaccompanied Clarinet in A,1947
Die Alpen, fantasy on Swiss folksongs, 1948
Gavotte de Concert, for trumpet and piano, 1950
2. Piano Concerto, 1953
Missa da Requiem, 1952–1953
1. Cello Concerto, 1954–55
3. Piano Concerto, 1961–62
Poème funèbre – En mémoire de Paul Hindemith for string orchestra, 1965
Omnia ad Unum, cantata, 1965–66
2. Cello Concerto, 1971
Te Deum, 1975
Clarinet Concerto, 1975–76
Consolatio philosophiae, 'Scène dramatique', 1979

References

Notes

Sources
Warrack, John and West, Ewan (1992), The Oxford Dictionary of Opera, 782 pages,  
Operone page on Sutermeister, accessed 1 April 2011

1910 births
1995 deaths
20th-century classical composers
20th-century male musicians
20th-century Swiss composers
Male opera composers
People from Feuerthalen
Swiss classical composers
Swiss male classical composers
Swiss opera composers